Richard Coombes (18 March 1858 – 15 April 1935) was a journalist and father of amateur athletics in Australia.

Coombes was born at Hampton Court, Middlesex, England the son of Richard Coombes, hotelkeeper, and his wife Ellen, née Parsons. Coombes was educated at Hampton Grammar School, he was for some years in an insurance office, and became well known as an amateur runner and walker. He was captain of the Harefield Hare and Hounds Club, a champion walker of the London Athletic Club and captain of the Kingston upon Thames Bicycle Club.

Coombes emigrated to Sydney in 1886 and took up journalism, becoming a contributor to the Referee. In 1888 he founded the New South Wales Amateur Athletic Association, introduced cross country running, and formed the Amateur Walkers Club. The amateur movement gradually spread all over Australia, and in 1897 the Amateur Athletic Union of Australia was formed. Coombes was a vice-president of the New South Wales Amateur Athletic Association from its foundation, in 1893 was elected president, and held the position until his death.

He also frequently acted as handicapper, starter, judge of field games or referee, at important athletic meetings, managed the New South Wales team in contests with the other states, and in 1911 was manager of the Australian team at the Empire games in London.

He was much interested in rifle-shooting, was captain of the Sydney Rifle Club and afterwards president, and was interested in rowing and coursing, being president of the New South Wales National Coursing Association for 22 years. When the Australian Coursing Union was formed in 1917 he was elected its first president 

About 1895 he formulated a set of walking rules which have been widely adopted.

As a journalist Coombes did a large amount of excellent work for the Referee under various pen-names.

He was editor for over 20 years, and showed himself to be a good editor and administrator. Advancing years led to his giving up the editorship, but he remained a contributor until 1932 when he resigned on a pension. He died at Sydney on 15 April 1935.

He married in 1895 Abbe May Talbot née Teas who survived him with a daughter, Gretchen. Coombes's greatest work was the inauguration of the Australasian amateur athletics movement, which at the time of his death was healthy, vigorous and carried on in the best traditions.

He was International Olympic Committee member from  1905 to 1932. 

Coombes was inducted into the Sport Australia Hall of Fame in 1992

References

External links

1858 births
1935 deaths
Australian journalists
Australian Olympic Committee administrators
Athletics in Australia
Australian people of English descent
Australian International Olympic Committee members
International Olympic Committee members
Athletics (track and field) administrators
Sport Australia Hall of Fame inductees